is a card battle manga and anime created by Bushiroad. The manga was drawn by Takuya Fujima and was serialized in Bushiroad's Bushiroad TCG Magazine. A 16-episode anime television series aired between June 5, 2009 and September 18, 2009 as a short segment on the live action television series Card Gakuen. A 12-episode sequel titled Weiß Survive R aired between December 4, 2009 and March 26, 2010, also on Card Gakuen. A manga adaptation of Weiß Survive R was serialized in Kadokawa Shoten's Comp Ace. It was collected in a single tankōbon volume, released on October 26, 2010.

The series introduced the collectible card game Weiß Schwarz.

Characters

Episodes

References

External links
 
 
 

2009 anime television series debuts
2009 Japanese television series debuts
2009 Japanese television series endings
Weiß Survive R
Card games in anime and manga
Bushiroad
Studio Hibari
Seinen manga